Ladinulidae is an extinct family of sea snails, marine gastropod molluscs in the superfamily Cerithioidea.

According to the taxonomy of the Gastropoda by Bouchet & Rocroi (2005) the family Ladinulidae has no subfamilies.

References